The Ladies of the Maccabees (L.O.T.M.) (renamed in 1892, Ladies of the Modern Maccabees (L.O.T.M.M.); in 1915, Women's Benefit Association; in 1966, North American Benefit Association) was the female auxiliary of the Knights of the Maccabees. It was the first fraternal benefit society operated exclusively by women. This was an insurance benefit society which grew to 80,000 members by 1913 and had paid out over $50 million in endowment benefits. The Ladies of the Maccabees Building, in Port Huron, Michigan was listed on the National Register of Historic Places in 1982.

Early history

On March 25, 1886, nine ladies met at the home of Adelphia Grace Ward (aka Mother of the Order, Past Great Commander) to establish the order of the Ladies of the Maccabees (L.O.T.M.). She became known as "Mother Ward" throughout the length and breadth of Maccabeedom.

The women began as a local club, or "Hive" in Muskegon, Michigan, but made application to form a statewide auxiliary at the Great Camps 1886 convention; they were denied. They tried again at the 1887 convention and were turned down. In 1888, permission was given to create a "Great Hive" for the state. Laws were drawn up and officials elected and the Great Hive of Michigan was chartered in May 1890. Great Hives were founded in other states such as Ohio and New York, and a "Supreme Hive" was established on October 1, 1892.

In 1892, there was a schism within the auxiliary and a new group was formed called the Ladies of the Modern Maccabees (L.O.T.M.M.). The L.O.T.M.M. were later led by schoolteacher Bina West Miller who wanted to help build a fraternal insurance society for women, and she was quite successful.

By December 1, 1896, there were Great Hives in half of the states in the Union as well as Canada and membership was up to 66,000, with 33,000 in Michigan alone.

20th century
The L.O.T.M.M. became the Women's Benefit Association in 1915 and the North American Benefit Association in 1966. 
In 1915, the L.O.T.M. had 179,719 members. The Ladies of the Maccebees merged into the Knights in 1926.

By the early twentieth century, the group had 100,000 members and by the late 1920s over 250,000. It still had 80,000 members in 1994.

Notable people 
 M. E. C. Bates (1839-1905), honorary member of Traverse Bay Hive
 Marion Babcock Baxter (1850-1910), deputy supreme commander
 Emma E. Bower (1852–1937) Great Record Keeper; published The Lady Maccabee
 Frances E. Burns (1866-1937), Great Commander for Michigan
 Dr. Mary M. Danforth, Supreme Medical Examiner 
 Eva C. Doughty (1852-1929), committee on credentials
 Lillian Hollister (1853–1911), elected Great Commander of the Ladies of the Maccabees, 1893
 Bina West Miller (1867-1954), L.O.T.M.M. leader

Gallery

References

 
1886 establishments in Michigan
Women's organizations based in the United States